Ishq Mein Teray (English In your love) is a Pakistani drama serial airing on Hum TV is directed by Faheem Burney, produced by Syed Afzal Ali and written by Sadia Akhtar. The serial was first aired on 27 November 2013 starring Mehwish Hayat, Azfar Rehman, Madiha Imam and Shahzad Nawaz and was last aired 26 March 2014 on Hum TV. The OST of drama is sung by Sohail Haider & Dua Malik.

This drama was also aired on Indian channel Zee Zindagi from 27 January 2016 every Monday to Saturday 6:10pm (IST) under the same title. .

Plot outline 
Ishq Mein Teray is a story embraced in bruises of life, where there is the sweetness of love and bitterness of relationships. The protagonist Aiza, is a sensible and simple girl who is conducting her household responsibilities very well. The second important character, Sheheryar Hamdani, whose daughter Laiba is Aiza's friend. Laiba is in love with her cousin, Saad Hamdani, who is her father's business assistant. Aiza's intellect draws both Saad and Sheharyar towards her.

Cast 
 Mehwish Hayat as Aiza
 Azfar Rehman as Saad Hamdani
 Madiha Imam as Laiba
 Shaheen Khan as Saad's mother
 Shahzad Nawaz as Sheheryar Hamdani
 Shazia Naz as Cuckoo

References

External links 
 
 
 Ishq Mein Teray at Dailymotion
 / Ishq Mein Teray on HUMNetwork
 Hum TV's official Youtube

Urdu-language television shows
Pakistani drama television series
2013 Pakistani television series debuts